Baron Trefgarne, of Cleddau in the County of Pembroke, is a title in the Peerage of the United Kingdom. It was created in 1947 for the barrister, journalist and politician, George Garro-Jones. In 1954 he assumed by deed poll the surname of Trefgarne in lieu of his patronymic.  the title is held by his son, the second Baron, who succeeded in 1960. He served in junior ministerial positions in the Conservative administrations of Margaret Thatcher and is now one of the ninety elected hereditary peers that remain in the House of Lords after the passing of the House of Lords Act 1999.

Barons Trefgarne (1947)
George Morgan Trefgarne, 1st Baron Trefgarne (1894–1960)
David Garro Trefgarne, 2nd Baron Trefgarne (born 1941)

The heir apparent is the present holder's eldest son, Hon. George Garro Trefgarne (b. 1970).
The heir apparent’s heir apparent is his son, William David Garro Trefgarne (b. 2010).

Arms

Notes

References
Kidd, Charles, Williamson, David (editors). Debrett's Peerage and Baronetage (1990 edition). New York: St Martin's Press, 1990, 

Baronies in the Peerage of the United Kingdom
Noble titles created in 1947
Noble titles created for UK MPs